Enting is both a surname and a given name. Notable people with the name include:

Ian G. Enting (born 1948), Australian mathematician
Xi Enting (1946–2019), Chinese table tennis player

See also
Entin